Mount Nash is a mountain, 1,295 m, standing 13 nautical miles (24 km) west-northwest of the head of Keller inlet and 12 nautical miles (22 km) north-northeast of Mount Owen, on the east coast of Palmer Land. Discovered by the Ronne Antarctic Research Expedition, 1947–48, under Ronne, who named it for H.R. Nash, of Pittsburgh, PA, a contributor to the expedition.

Mountains of Palmer Land